The Baixada Fluminense (standard ;) (literally "Fluminense Lowland") is a region in the state of Rio de Janeiro, in southeastern Brazil. It is located on Guanabara Bay, between Rio de Janeiro to the south and the Serra dos Órgãos range of hills to the north.

Its municipalities are part of the Rio de Janeiro Metropolitan Region. The Baixada Fluminense region's population is about three million, making it the second most populous region in the state, following only the city of Rio de Janeiro.

This region should not be confused with the Baixadas Litorâneas, located farther to the east in the same state.

Geography

The Baixada Fluminense includes the municipalities of Duque de Caxias, Nova Iguaçu, São João de Meriti, Nilópolis, Belford Roxo, Queimados and Mesquita, all north of the city of Rio de Janeiro.

The municipalities of Magé and Guapimirim (to the east), Japeri, Paracambi and Seropédica.

History
18th century
Until the 19th century, the region was known as the Baixada da Guanabara. It experienced some development during the 18th century, when it was an important corridor for transporting gold mined in the neighboring state of Minas Gerais.

19th century
In the 19th century was one of the first regions to develop coffee plantations. However, during the reign of Emperor Pedro II the region suffered serious economic decline due to the creation of railroads, which led to a sharp decline in the traffic on the region's rivers and roads.

20th century
In the early 20th century the area experienced a large influx of people arriving from other parts of the country, mainly from Espírito Santo, Minas Gerais and Northeastern Brazil, in search of a better quality of life near Rio de Janeiro, which at the time was the capital of Brazil.

In the second half of the 20th century, the region acquired a reputation for poverty, crime and inadequate social services, which continues to this day. Favelas are located here.

Large marsh drainage projects were undertaken in order to improve sanitary conditions.

21st century
In 2005, 29 people were killed in a mass shooting.

References

Geography of Rio de Janeiro (state)